Pyrenecosa spinosa is a wolf spider species found in Andorra.

References

External links 

Lycosidae
Spiders of Europe
Fauna of Andorra
Spiders described in 1938